The 8th TVyNovelas Awards, is an Academy of special awards to the best of soap operas and TV shows. The awards ceremony took place on April 2, 1990 in the Centro de Espectáculos “Premier“, México D.F. The ceremony was televised in the Mexico by Canal de las estrellas.

Joaquín Cordero and Roxana Saucedo hosted the show. Mi segunda madre won 6 awards including Best Telenovela of the Year, the most for the evening. Other winners Dulce desafío and La casa al final de la calle won 4 awards, Teresa won 3 awards also including Best Telenovela of the Year, Carrusel won 2 awards, Lo blanco y lo negro, and Morir para vivir won one each.

Summary of awards and nominations

Winners and nominees

Novelas

Others

Special Awards
Best Female Hair: Lucero
Best Male Hair: Eduardo Yáñez
Best Smile in Telenovela: Leticia Calderón

Awards after the show
Delivered by popular vote, after the transmission of the awards ceremony on TV
The most elegant: Lola Beltran

References 

TVyNovelas Awards
TVyNovelas Awards
TVyNovelas Awards
TVyNovelas Awards ceremonies